Caboolture Bus Lines is an Australian operator of bus services in the northern suburbs of Brisbane. It operates 12 services under contract to the Queensland Government under the Translink banner.

History
Caboolture Bus Lines was founded in 1988 by Grant and Jannette Craike with two buses. In July 2020 Bribie Island Coaches was acquired.

Routes

Fleet
As at December 2022, the fleet consisted of 66 buses.

References

External links
Showbus gallery

Bus companies of Queensland
Public transport in Brisbane
Translink (Queensland)
Transport companies established in 1988
1988 establishments in Australia